The Legendary Siblings is a Taiwanese television series adapted from Gu Long's novel Juedai Shuangjiao. The series was directed by Lee Kwok-lap and starred Jimmy Lin and Alec Su in the leading roles. It was first broadcast on TTV in Taiwan in 1999 and was followed by The Legendary Siblings 2 in 2002.

Cast
 Jimmy Lin as Xiaoyu'er
 Alec Su as Hua Wuque
 Vivian Chen as Tie Xinlan
 Theresa Lee as Zhang Jing
 Yu Li as Yaoyue
 Chang Jui-chu as Lianxing
 Lin Jui-yang as Yan Nantian
 Chen Chun-sheng as Jiang Feng
 Stephanie Hsiao as Hua Yuenu
 Power Chan as Black Spider
 Kevin Cheng as Jiang Yulang
 Sang Ni as Tie Pinggu
 Li Li-chun as Li Dazui
 Ge Lei as Tu Jiaojiao
 Berg Ng as Du Sha
 Lu Ting-yu as Haha'er
 Tsai Chia-hung as Xiao Mimi
 Liu Chia-jung as Tie Zhan
 Lou Hsueh-hsian as Xuanyuan Sanguang
 Liu Shang-chian as Wan Chunliu
 Hou Ping-ying as Murong Jiu
 Lien Ching-wen as Hai Hongzhu
 Wang Tao as Jiang Biehe

International broadcasts
Philippines: Amazing Twins began airing on IBC from March 8, 2003 to December 13, 2003, replacing Star for a Night. The program moved to ABC in April 2004, and on ABS-CBN from October 3, 2005 to January 20, 2006, and was replaced by Outstanding Twins.

External links
 

Works based on Juedai Shuangjiao
Taiwanese wuxia television series
1999 Taiwanese television series debuts
Television series by Tangren Media
Television shows based on works by Gu Long